The Battle of Booneville was fought on July 1, 1862, in Booneville, Mississippi, during the American Civil War.

Battle
After the Union Army victory at Shiloh, Maj. Gen. Henry W. Halleck moved his forces slowly toward Corinth, an important rail center. By May 25, 1862, after traveling  in three weeks, Halleck was positioned to lay siege to the town. But on May 29, the Confederate forces under General P.G.T. Beauregard slipped away undetected and moved toward Tupelo, Mississippi. In late June, Halleck ordered his forces south and learned that the Confederates, by then under Bragg, were advancing toward Corinth. The 31-year-old Union Col. Philip Sheridan established a fortified position to the south at Booneville on June 28 to await the Confederate attack.

Lead elements of 4,700 troops under the Confederate Brig. The pickets fell back and established a sound defensive line at the intersection of the roads from Tupelo and Saltillo. Aided by the superiority of their new Colt revolving rifles, the line withstood the initial Confederate assault before withdrawing to a backup position  closer to the town.

Chalmers' effort to turn the left flank of this new line was thwarted when Sheridan's main force joined the battle. The bulk of the Union force stayed on the defensive while Sheridan ordered Lt. Col. Edward Hatch in command of the 2nd Iowa Cavalry to select two companies of the 2nd Michigan Cavalry under Capt. Russell Alexander Alger and company "B" and company "F" of the 2nd Iowa Cavalry to circle around the enemy in secret and attack the rear of Chalmers' forces with saber and pistol while the remainder of the dismounted 2nd Michigan Cavalry and 2nd Iowa Cavalry attacked the Confederate forces from the front. The cavalry forces pushed Chalmers to retreat and Sheridan called off the pursuit after , when his fatigued troops encountered swampy terrain.

Aftermath
Sheridan estimated that Chalmers lost 65 troops killed in the battle; Federal casualties were one dead, 24 wounded, and 16 missing. Due to the battle, Bragg delayed his offensive strategy for Corinth, allowing Halleck additional time to unite his troops.

References

 Eldridge, David P., "Battle of Booneville, Mississippi (1 July 1862)", Encyclopedia of the American Civil War: A Political, Social, and Military History, Heidler, David S., and Heidler, Jeanne T., eds., W. W. Norton & Company, 2000, .
 Lyftogt, Kenneth L., "Iowa and the Civil War Volume 2: From Iuka to the Red River 1862-1864", p 168-170, Camp Pope Publishing, 2020, .

External links
 Civil War Album

Prentiss County, Mississippi
Booneville
Booneville
Booneville
1862 in the American Civil War
July 1862 events